Marcos Baghdatis was the defending champion but chose not to compete.

John Millman won the tournament, defeating Austin Krajicek in the final, 7–5, 2–6, 6–3.

Seeds

  John Millman (champion)
  Malek Jaziri (quarterfinals)
  Kyle Edmund (semifinals)
  Bjorn Fratangelo (semifinals)
  Taro Daniel (quarterfinals)
  Matthew Ebden (quarterfinals)
  Austin Krajicek (final)
  Yoshihito Nishioka (quarterfinals)

Draw

Finals

Top half

Bottom half

References 
 Main draw
 Qualifying draw

Comerica Bank Challenger - Men's Singles
2015 Men's Singles